Los Fresnos High School, also abbreviated as  LFHS, is a public high school located in Los Fresnos, Texas (USA). It is the sole high school in the Los Fresnos Consolidated Independent School District. In 2015, the school was rated "Met Standard" by the Texas Education Agency.

Athletics
The Los Fresnos Falcons compete in the following sports:

Marching Band
Baseball
Basketball
Cross Country
Football
Golf
Powerlifting
Soccer
Softball
Swimming and Diving
NJROTC
Tennis
Track and Field
Volleyball
Wrestling

References

External links 
 

High schools in Cameron County, Texas
Public high schools in Texas